Sergio Romero (born 1987) is an Argentine football goalkeeper.

Sergio Romero may also refer to:

Sergio Romero Pizarro (born 1938), Chilean politician
Sergio Romero (Colombian footballer) (born 1988), Colombian football forward